Alive in New York is a live album by trumpeter Red Rodney with multi-instrumentalist Ira Sullivan which was recorded at the Village Vanguard and released on the Muse label in 1986.

Reception

The AllMusic review by Scott Yanow stated "Trumpeter Rodney, Sullivan (heard here on flute, alto and tenor), the up and coming pianist Garry Dial, bassist Paul Berner and drummer Tom Whaley all sound in inventive form as they take post-bop improvisations. This was a perfect setting for Rodney in particular, and all of the underrated band's six recordings are rewarding".

Track listing
 "Recorda-Me (Remember Me)" (Joe Henderson) – 7:45
 "Monday's Dance" (Ira Sullivan) – 7:55
 "Let's Cool One" (Thelonious Monk) – 6:50
 "Red Hot and Blues" (Red Rodney) – 9:28
 "Shutters" (Garry Dial) – 7:55

Personnel
Red Rodney – trumpet, flugelhorn
Ira Sullivan - flute, alto saxophone, tenor saxophone
Garry Dial – piano
Paul Berner – bass
Tom Whaley – drums

References

Muse Records live albums
Red Rodney live albums
Ira Sullivan live albums
1986 live albums
Albums produced by Bob Porter (record producer)
Albums recorded at the Village Vanguard